is a science fiction OVA series released in 1983. It was conceptualized by Hisayuki Toriumi, who also wrote the script and directed it with Mamoru Oshii. It is widely considered not only the first OVA released but also the first animated direct-to-video production release.

The storyline focuses on a rebellion on a Moon colony by settlers and a mysterious artifact called Dallos. The story and setting take influence by past works such as the 1966 feature film The Battle of Algiers and the 1966 novel The Moon Is a Harsh Mistress.

Story
In the near future, humanity has drained the Earth of its resources. To sustain Earth's populace, mining colonies are created on the Moon to provide vital natural resources.

After generations of mistreatment from the Earth Federal Government, the colonists retaliate by performing acts of terrorism leading directly to a conflict with their overseers. A mysterious structure on the Moon called Dallos is worshipped by the colonists and gives them hope. A young colonist by the name of Shun Nonomura is caught into the fray as he joins the rebels, dramatically affecting the lives of those close to him with his actions. A generational divide between the younger natural born colonists and their older compatriots arises as the allegiance to Earth as humanity's motherland is questioned.

Cast

The compilation film Dallos Special has English and Spanish dubs, but of unknown actors. The Japanese cast is retained.

The characters Alex Leiger, Doug McCoy, and Erna are sometimes known as Alex Riger, Dog McCoy, and Elna; respectively.

Episodes

The four episodes were edited together to create the 85 minute-long film Dallos Special in 1985.

Release
In 1991, Celebrity Home Entertainment released the Toho English dub of Dallos Special on VHS under the title Battle for Moon Station Dallos but censored. This feature version was later reissued by Best Film and Video Corp simply titled Dallos. Discotek Media released the OVA series in uncut form on DVD in 2014. The streaming platform Crunchyroll added the OVA series to its catalog in May 2015.

In Spain, it was distributed, licensed, and dubbed onto VHS format by Chiqui Video during the 80's.

References

External links
 
 Review of Dallos at Anime Bargain Bin

1983 anime OVAs
Pierrot (company)
Bandai Visual
Science fiction anime and manga
Discotek Media